Suling Jatta (died 24 June 1855) was a Mandinka and jola  of King of Kombo during the mid-nineteenth century. Jatta was persuaded to cede a portion of his territory called Kombo North/Saint Mary to the British in 1840 for African-American freed slaves. He led the Soninke during the early part of the Soninke-Marabout War, and after the Storming of Sabbajee in 1853, ceded more land to the British. Jatta was killed after being shot through the heart during a Marabout attack on his capital at Busumbala in 1855. He was buried in Old Busumbala( Tungbung Ngoto). After the war most of the Jatta clan moved to [all over the regions].

King of Kombo 
In 1840, Jatta was persuaded by Sir Henry Vere Huntley, the Lieutenant Governor of the Gambia, to cede a northern portion of his territory to the British as a settlement for Liberated Africans. This territory later went by several names, including British Kombo, Kombo St. Mary, and Cape St. Mary.

Jatta was the sitting King when the Soninke-Marabout War broke out in 1850. The war saw the ruling Soninke people pitted against radical Islamists known as Marabouts. Jatta led the Soninke faction in the war, which was focused on the towns of Yundum, Busumbala, and Brikama. The Marabouts were focused at Sabbajee, Gunjur, and Brefet. Much of the early war was fought via mercenaries. Jatta signed a treaty with British Governor Luke Smythe O'Connor in 1853, in which agreed to cede a further northern part of his territory, including the town of Sabbajee, on the condition that the British quell the Marabouts in the area. This led to the first Storming of Sabbajee in 1853.

Jatta was killed in battle on 24 June 1855, when a Marabout force under the Mandinka commander Fodi Kabba Dumbuya attacked his capital at Busumbala. His forces were able to repel the attack, but Jatta had been shot through the heart and was killed instantly in the fray.

References 

1855 deaths
Gambian royalty
19th-century monarchs in Africa